VenFin is a South African active private equity and venture capital investment company focusing on high growth investment opportunities. The company has assets in excess of $1.1 billion spanning the telecommunications, software, energy and media sectors. VenFin also has selected fund and direct investments in China.

Prior to 1 January 2006, VenFin was listed on the JSE Securities Exchange (JSE) with its largest investment being a 15% stake in Vodacom Group (Pty) Ltd, South Africa’s largest mobile network operator. The group subsequently disposed of the Vodacom investment to Vodafone plc, and delisted from the JSE. More recently, VenFin disposed of its 25% stake in Alexander Forbes, a leading South African insurance broker and financial services company, for just under $300 million. As of 2012 VenFin’s largest investments are in global systems integrator Dimension Data plc, free to air television broadcaster e.tv and vehicle tracking provider Tracker. The company is actively making new investments across a number of sectors, including media, telecommunications, technology and renewable and alternate energy.

References

Venture capital firms